About a Girl may refer to:

"About a Girl" (Nirvana song)
"About a Girl" (Sugababes song)
"About a Girl" (The Academy Is song)
About a Girl (album), album by Winter Gloves
About a Girl (TV series), Canadian television series
About a Girl (2001 film), short film
About a Girl (2014 film), German film

See also
About a Boy (disambiguation)